The 13th parallel north is a circle of latitude that is 13 degrees north of the Earth's equatorial plane. It crosses Africa, Asia, the Indian Ocean, the Pacific Ocean, Central America, the Caribbean and the Atlantic Ocean.

At this latitude the sun is visible for 12 hours, 53 minutes during the summer solstice and 11 hours, 22 minutes during the winter solstice.

Around the world
Starting at the Prime Meridian and heading eastwards, the parallel 13° north passes through:

{| class="wikitable plainrowheaders"
! scope="col" | Co-ordinates
! scope="col" | Country, territory or sea
! scope="col" | Notes
|-
| 
! scope="row" | 
|
|-
| 
! scope="row" | 
|
|-
| 
! scope="row" | 
|
|-
| 
! scope="row" | 
| For about 14 km
|-
| 
! scope="row" | 
|
|-
| 
! scope="row" | 
|
|-
| 
! scope="row" | 
|
|-
| style="background:#b0e0e6;" | 
! scope="row" style="background:#b0e0e6;" | Lake Chad
| style="background:#b0e0e6;" | Passing through territorial waters of 
|-
| 
! scope="row" | 
|
|-
| 
! scope="row" | 
|
|-
| 
! scope="row" | 
|
|-
| 
! scope="row" | 
|
|-
| style="background:#b0e0e6;" | 
! scope="row" style="background:#b0e0e6;" | Red Sea
| style="background:#b0e0e6;" |
|-
| 
! scope="row" | 
|
|-valign="top"
| style="background:#b0e0e6;" | 
! scope="row" style="background:#b0e0e6;" | Indian Ocean
| style="background:#b0e0e6;" | Gulf of Aden (passing just north of Socotra) Arabian Sea Laccadive Sea
|-valign="top"
| 
! scope="row" | 
| Karnataka - passing through Bangalore Andhra Pradesh Tamil Nadu - passing through the southern parts of Chennai
|-
| style="background:#b0e0e6;" | 
! scope="row" style="background:#b0e0e6;" | Indian Ocean
| style="background:#b0e0e6;" | Bay of Bengal - passing just north of Interview Island, 
|-
| 
! scope="row" | 
| Andaman and Nicobar Islands - North Andaman Island
|-
| style="background:#b0e0e6;" | 
! scope="row" style="background:#b0e0e6;" | Indian Ocean
| style="background:#b0e0e6;" | Andaman Sea (passing just north of Sound Island)
|-
| 
! scope="row" |  (Burma)
| Island of Mali Kyun
|-
| style="background:#b0e0e6;" | 
! scope="row" style="background:#b0e0e6;" | Indian Ocean
| style="background:#b0e0e6;" | Andaman Sea
|-
| 
! scope="row" |  (Burma)
|
|-
| 
! scope="row" | 
| Phetchaburi province
|-
| style="background:#b0e0e6;" | 
! scope="row" style="background:#b0e0e6;" | Bay of Bangkok
| style="background:#b0e0e6;" |
|-
| 
! scope="row" | 
| Passing just north of Pattaya
|-
| 
! scope="row" | 
| Passing through Tonlé Sap lake
|-
| 
! scope="row" | 
|
|-
| style="background:#b0e0e6;" | 
! scope="row" style="background:#b0e0e6;" | South China Sea
| style="background:#b0e0e6;" |
|-
| 
! scope="row" | 
| Island of Mindoro
|-
| style="background:#b0e0e6;" | 
! scope="row" style="background:#b0e0e6;" | Tablas Strait
| style="background:#b0e0e6;" | Passing just north of Maestro de Campo Island, 
|-
| style="background:#b0e0e6;" | 
! scope="row" style="background:#b0e0e6;" | Sibuyan Sea
| style="background:#b0e0e6;" | Passing just north of Banton Island, 
|-
| 
! scope="row" | 
| Island of Burias
|-
| style="background:#b0e0e6;" | 
! scope="row" style="background:#b0e0e6;" | Burias Pass
| style="background:#b0e0e6;" |
|-
| 
! scope="row" | 
| Island of Luzon
|-
| style="background:#b0e0e6;" | 
! scope="row" style="background:#b0e0e6;" | Pacific Ocean
| style="background:#b0e0e6;" | Passing just south of 
|-
| 
! scope="row" | 
| Passing through the Cosigüina volcano
|-
| style="background:#b0e0e6;" | 
! scope="row" style="background:#b0e0e6;" | Pacific Ocean
| style="background:#b0e0e6;" | Gulf of Fonseca
|-
| 
! scope="row" | 
| Extreme south of the country
|-
| 
! scope="row" | 
|
|-
| style="background:#b0e0e6;" | 
! scope="row" style="background:#b0e0e6;" | Caribbean Sea
| style="background:#b0e0e6;" |
|-
| 
! scope="row" | 
| Island of Bequia
|-
| style="background:#b0e0e6;" | 
! scope="row" style="background:#b0e0e6;" | Atlantic Ocean
| style="background:#b0e0e6;" | Passing just south of 
|-
| 
! scope="row" | 
|
|-
| 
! scope="row" | 
|
|-
| 
! scope="row" | 
|
|}

See also
12th parallel north
14th parallel north

References

n13